Illyrian amber figures are a group of small human and animal figures made out of amber. They were made from the start of the Iron Age around 1000 BC and their production continued down through the millennium. They  are found in nearly all of Illyria from Slovenia in the north to Albania and North Macedonia in the south. The sites with the most figures found are Ripač in Bosnia (15 figures in total of animals and humans) and Ormož in Slovenia (10 human and 13 animal figures). The purpose of these figures is still a mystery and they could as well have been Illyrian deities, figures to represent the cult of the dead or simply children's toys. Amber was a plastic that Illyrians were very fond of and many of their jewellery and decorative objects were made of amber. For these figures it is hard to say that they are artistic objects.

References

Illyrian art
Ancient art